Route 745 is a  long mostly north–south secondary highway in the southwestern portion of New Brunswick, Canada. Most of the route is in Charlotte County.

The route starts in a densely wooded area north of Beaconsfield and travels southeast over the Canoose Stream in Canoose. Continuing, the road enters Oak Hill and continues to Route 730. The road continues and passes Cranberry Lake and ends at Route 3 between Moores Mills and Old Ridge.

See also

References

745
745